Hamadryas laodamia, the starry night cracker or starry cracker, is a species of cracker butterfly in the family Nymphalidae. It can be found from Mexico to the Amazon basin, but is most common in lowland forest in the Caribbean area.

Description
The starry night cracker is a black butterfly with iridescent blue speckling on its wings. The female has a white band on the underside of the forewing that is broader than the band on the male. The caterpillars have short horns on their heads, the function of which is unknown, and the pupae are bright green.

Distribution
This butterfly is native to the Caribbean area, Central America and tropical South America.

Ecology
The larvae of the starry night cracker feed on the leaves of Dalechampia triphylla, a vine in the family Euphorbiaceae. This butterfly exhibits aposematic colouring and is avoided by jacamars, birds that feed on other members of this family that rely on camouflage for their protection. It appears that the larvae of the starry night cracker store up distasteful toxic chemicals from the leaves, and the jacamars learn to avoid the vividly coloured adult butterflies.

The adult butterflies do not visit flowers, instead obtaining their nourishment by sucking the juices from rotting fruit. Like their well-camouflaged relatives, starry night crackers like to rest head-downward on the trunks of trees with their wings flattened against the bark.

Subspecies
Hamadryas laodamia laodamia (Mexico to Peru, Bolivia, Suriname and Brazil)
H. laodamia saurites (Mexico to Colombia)

References

Hamadryas (butterfly)
Butterflies of North America
Butterflies of Central America
Lepidoptera of Brazil
Nymphalidae of South America
Butterflies described in 1777